Bernardina Maria "Berny" Boxem-Lenferink (née Lenferink on 12 May 1948) is a retired Dutch middle-distance runner. She competed at the 1972 Summer Olympics in the 1500 metres event and finished in ninth place. She won a silver medal at the 1971 International Cross Country Championships.

Biography
Berny Lenferink was born to Wijlen Antonius Jan Lenferink and Wilhelmina Maria Boswerger in a family of nine siblings. She came to an athletics club following her elder sister Ans. In 1968, she competed in her first national championships, in the 800 m, and finished behind Ans, who won the bronze medal. During that race she broke a bone in her foot, which hindered her training through 1968–1969.

On 23 December 1970, Lenferinke married Leo Boxem and changed her last name to Boxem-Lenferink. She retired from athletics shortly after the 1972 Olympics, aged 24, due to lack of motivation. During her career she won two national crosscountry titles (2600 m in 1971 and 2500 m in 1972).

References

External link

1948 births
Living people
Dutch female middle-distance runners
Athletes (track and field) at the 1972 Summer Olympics
Olympic athletes of the Netherlands
People from Tubbergen
20th-century Dutch women
21st-century Dutch women
Sportspeople from Overijssel